Indian was launched in 1813 in New York, possibly under another name. She entered British records in 1815, probably as a prize. In 1820 she sailed to Valparaiso, where she got caught up in the conflict between Spain and the independence movement in Peru and Chile. She was condemned at Valparaiso in March 1821.

Career
Indian first appeared in Lloyd's Register (LR) in 1815.

Fate
Indian was caught up in the conflict between Spain and the local independence movement in South America. The report listed a number of other vessels, British and American, such as Indian, that had also been detained by one side or the other. 

On 18 February 1821, 89 days after a whale sank , Indian, Crozier, master, spotted and rescued three survivors.

Edward Ellice, Lord Suffield, and Indian, which  Lord Cochrane's squadron had detained, arrived at Valparaiso on 1 March 1821 for adjudication. A later report was that the Prize Court at Valparaiso had condemned Indian and her cargo. Edward Ellice and Lord Suffield had not yet been adjudicated. An advice dated 8 August at Santiago de Chili reported that Edward Ellice and Lord Suffield had been restored, with their cargoes.

There is no record of Indian being restored, and she disappeared from online records.

Citations

1813 ships
Ships built in the United States
Captured ships
Age of Sail merchant ships of England